Renneville may refer to:

communes in France:
Renneville, Ardennes, in the Ardennes département
Renneville, Eure, in the Eure département 
Renneville, Haute-Garonne, in the Haute-Garonne département 
René Auguste Constantin de Renneville (1650–1723), author and famous prisoner of the Bastille